Trey Ideker is a professor of medicine and bioengineering at UC San Diego. He is the Director of the National Resource for Network Biology, the San Diego Center for Systems Biology, and the Cancer Cell Map Initiative. He uses genome-scale measurements to construct network models of cellular processes and disease.

Education
Ideker received Bachelor’s and Master’s degrees from M.I.T. in Electrical Engineering and Computer Science, and his Ph.D. from the University of Washington in Molecular Biology under the supervision of Leroy Hood.

While working with Hood, Ideker was one of the first researchers to publish an integrated computational model of a metabolic network. As of 2017, the paper describing this model has been cited over 2,200 times.

Career
Following his PhD, Ideker worked at the Whitehead Institute for Biomedical Research at M.I.T. In 2003, Ideker joined UC San Diego as an Assistant Professor of Bioengineering. In 2006, became an Associate Professor of Bioengineering and Adjunct Professor of Computer Science. He served as Division Chief of Medical Genetics from 2009 – 2016. Since 2010, he has been a Professor of Medicine and Bioengineering. Ideker has also served as Adjunct Professor at the Moores Cancer Center and has acted as a consultant for companies including Ideaya Biosciences, Inc. and Data4Cure, Inc.

Ideker serves on the Editorial Boards for Cell, Cell Reports, Nature, EMBO, and PLoS Computational Biology and is a Fellow of AAAS and AIMBE.

In 2013, Ideker, along with Kang Zhang, identified that the molecular aging clock could be measured by blood and tissues, and made use of epigenetic markers.

Awards
In 2005, Ideker was named as one of the top innovators in the world under the age of 35 by the MIT Technology Review TR35. The following year, Technology Review named him one of the Top 10 Innovators of 2006. In 2009, he was awarded the Overton Prize by the International Society for Computational Biology in recognition of his significant contribution to the field of computational biology. In 2022, he was elected as a Fellow of the International Society for Computational Biology.

References

Overton Prize winners
American bioinformaticians
Living people
Fellows of the American Institute for Medical and Biological Engineering
Year of birth missing (living people)
Network scientists